"More, More, More" is a song written by Gregg Diamond and recorded by American artist Andrea True (credited to her recording project Andrea True Connection). It was released in February 1976 as the first single from her debut album by same name (1976), becoming her signature track and one of the most popular songs of the disco era. In the US, it reached number four on the Billboard Hot 100 and spent three weeks at number three on the Cash Box chart in July of that year. In Canada, it was a number one hit.

Background
The song was originally recorded in 1975 in Jamaica where True, a porn star, had been appearing in a TV commercial. Unable to return to the United States due to a government ban on asset transfers, she opted to invest the money in a studio recording to advance her career as a singer. True called on Gregg Diamond to come to Jamaica and record it with her and other studio musicians which formed the backbone of the "Connection" project. Diamond had begun work on compositions that would ultimately evolve into "More, More, More". He decided to have Andrea perform vocals in part due to her career as an adult film actor. Although Diamond is officially credited as the sole author of the track, True has claimed that she wrote the song's lyrics, while he composed the music. When asked about True's limited vocal ability, Diamond commented: "[Y]ou can do marvelous things with tape delay."

The original take of the song was first released in Jamaica by Federal Records in 1975, after True and Diamond, having run out of money and unable to pay session musicians for their work, handed in the master tapes to them. Buddah Records subsequently released the song only to discos in the winter of 1975/1976. The popularity of "More, More, More" was immense. Widespread listener interest convinced Buddah to release the single commercially in May, newly remastered by Tom Moulton. The song rose to number four on the Billboard Hot 100 and number twenty three on the soul singles chart. The single was a successful disco hit peaking at number two. In Canada, it topped the RPM Top Singles chart for one week in July 1976. Overseas, the song peaked at number five on the UK Singles Chart. Following the track's popularity in Latin America, True recorded a Spanish language version, "Más, Más, Más".

In 1976, the Andrea True Connection sang "More, More, More", "Party Line", and "Fill Me Up (Heart to Heart)" live on Don Kirshner's Rock Concert. It was also performed on American Bandstand and on Top of the Pops, as well as on the West German TV shows Musikladen and Disco.

Track listings and formats
 7" vinyl
 "More, More, More" (Part 1) – 3:02
 "More, More, More" (Part 2) – 6:15

 7" vinyl (Jamaica)
 "More, More, More"
 "More, More, More" (Instrumental)

Credits and personnel
Credits and personnel are adapted from the More, More, More album liner notes.
 Andrea True – vocals
 Gregg Diamond – percussion, piano, producer, arrangement
 Godfrey Diamond – drums, engineering
 Steve Love – guitar
 Jim Gregory – bass
 Enrique Moore – saxophone
 James Smart – trumpet
 David Whittman – engineering
 George Raymond – engineering

Charts

Weekly charts

Year-end charts

Certifications and sales

Bananarama version

In 1993, "More, More, More" was covered by English group Bananarama for their sixth album, Please Yourself (1993). It was produced by Mike Stock and Pete Waterman of Stock Aitken Waterman fame. Their version retained the disco feel of the original and also incorporated elements of ABBA-like production, as was the case with the entire Please Yourself album. Sara Dallin, Keren Woodward, Stock and Waterman added a second verse to their version of the song. 

Bananarama's single version (which was remixed from their album version) climbed to number 24 in the UK Singles Chart. It also peaked at number eight in Portugal, number 16 in Ireland and number 65 in Germany. It was their last single to be released by London Records, their label since 1983. The duo would not see another single-release in the UK until "Move in My Direction" in 2005.

Critical reception
In an retrospective review, Quentin Harrison from Albumism wrote that "Bananarama retrofits it cunningly to early '90s house vibes and just like that, Bananarama have convincingly recast the song as their own." Upon the release, James Masterton" deemed it "a fairly faithful cover" in his UK chart commentary. He added, "With the 70s disco revival well underway it is a timely release and may yet see Sarah and Keren scaling the heights of "Love In The First Degree" again, surely amongst the greatest moments of 1980s pop."

Music video
A music video was produced to promote the single, directed by Saffie Ashtiany. It features Bananarama performing the song and dancing (in one of their few unchoreographed videos) in a cabaret-style club with several male dancers backing them up. The video was published on YouTube in September 2017.

Track listings

 UK CD 1 single
 "More, More, More" (Dave Ford Mix) – 3:24
 "Love in the First Degree" – 3:31
 "I Want You Back" – 3:47
 "I Heard a Rumour" – 3:24

 UK CD 2 single
 "More, More, More" (Dave Ford Mix) – 3:24
 "More, More, More" (12-inch mix) – 5:18
 "Give It All Up for Love" – 3:57
 "More, More, More" (I Can't Techno More Mix) – 5:01

Charts

Rachel Stevens version

Former S Club 7 member Rachel Stevens covered "More More More" for the re-released version of her debut album, Funky Dory (2004), and released it as the final single from that album. Released on October 4, 2004, Stevens' version reached number three in the UK, outplacing all of the previous versions of the track, and also reached number five in Ireland. The song was featured in an advertising campaign for Sky Sports' football coverage for the 2004–2005 season and in adverts for sofa retailer ScS.

Track listings
 UK CD1
 "More, More, More" (single mix) – 2:47
 "Shoulda Thought of That" (Howard New, Lucie Silvas) – 3:14

 UK CD2
 "More, More, More" (single mix) – 2:47
 "Fools" (Princess Diaries 2 version) – 3:13
 "More, More, More" (The Sharp Boys Sky's the Limit Club Remix) – 7:43
 "More, More, More" (video enhancement)

Charts

Weekly charts

Year-end charts

Samplings
In 1999, Canadian band Len sampled the instrumental break in "More, More, More" and used it as the backdrop for their top-ten single "Steal My Sunshine".

In popular culture
The Andrea True Connection's version of "More, More, More" has appeared in Whit Stillman's movie The Last Days of Disco (1998) during scenes between Alice (Chloe Sevigny) and Tom (Robert Sean Leonard) at the disco and then back at Tom's place. The song is also part of the movie's soundtrack album. On the show The King of Queens, the 2001 episode "Hi-Def Jam" opened with Doug Heffernan singing a parody version, "Doug, Doug, Doug". The song then appeared in the 2002 film Dahmer during a nightclub montage.

The Andrea True Connection's version of "More, More, More" has also appeared in two episodes of The Simpsons. In the 2003 episode "Dude, Where's My Ranch?", after Moe Szyslak kidnaps David Byrne (who guest-starred in the episode as himself), a parody version of the song plays on the radio featuring Moe singing, "Moe, Moe, Moe! How do you like me? How do you like me? Moe, Moe, Moe! Why don't you like me? Nobody likes me!" The song is credited to "The Moe Szyslak Connection". The song also appears in the episode "Sweets and Sour Marge", where Disco Stu plays the song after "snorting" lines of sugar.

"More, More, More" was also used in the 2005 documentary Inside Deep Throat. In 2006, the song appeared in Click and was used during one of the flashback scenes. The song was featured in American Dad!, Season 3, Episode 2, "Meter Made" in 2006. The track was used by HBO to promote their series Sex in the City and later in a parody of that promo for The Chris Rock Show, which featured rapper Biz Markie on the lead vocals.

The late professional wrestler Larry Sweeney formerly used the song as his entrance theme.

Stevens' version of the song is used in adverts for the UK sofa company ScS. A version of the song by Dagny was used by Target in a commercial campaign introducing its line of new products in the fall of 2017. Andrea True Connection's version appears in a 2004 commercial for New York & Company and 2019 commercial for Applebee's.

Save-On-Foods, a popular chain of grocery stores owned by the Jim Pattison Group of British Columbia, Canada used a chorus sample in their television and radio commercials in the late 2000s. This was to promote their in-house rewards program known as Save-On-More rewards. Later shortened to More Rewards.

References

External links
 Official music video on YouTube
 Andrea True Connection at Discogs

1976 singles
1976 songs
1993 singles
2004 singles
19 Recordings singles
Andrea True Connection songs
Bananarama songs
Buddah Records singles
London Records singles
Polydor Records singles
Rachel Stevens songs
RPM Top Singles number-one singles
Samantha Fox songs
Songs written by Gregg Diamond